Joseph Munda is an Indian politician belonging to All India Trinamool Congress. He was elected as INC MLA of Nagrakata Vidhan Sabha Constituency in West Bengal Legislative Assembly in 2011. Now he is the President of Matiali Block Trinamool Congress.

References

Living people
Trinamool Congress politicians from West Bengal
West Bengal MLAs 2011–2016
Year of birth missing (living people)
Santali people